Paco Gigi Craig (born 19 October 1992) is an English professional footballer who plays as a defender for Miami FC in the USL Championship. He is the son of Mikey Craig, bass player of the band Culture Club.

Early life

Personal
Paco Craig was born in London, England to Lilli and Mikey Craig and has two brothers as well as one half-brother and one half-sister. At the urging of his father he played both football and was a drummer in a band with his brother. He attended secondary school at Dame Alice Owen where he played rugby, football, and basketball and was named captain of his football team.

College and youth career
Craig played in the West Ham United youth system from 2008 to 2011. Following his release he went on trial with League Two side Gillingham before spending a season with National League North club Bishop's Stortford.

Not wanting to play non-league football, Craig moved to the U.S. and played three years of college soccer at Young Harris College between 2013 and 2015. In each of Craig's three seasons with the team, Young Harris College won the Peach Belt Conference title while winning the Peach Belt Conference Tournament twice. As a Freshman Craig won the Conference's Freshman of the Year award as well as winning the Conference's Player of the Year award as a Junior.  Craig was the second player to win both awards during his career. He finished his career with 17 goals and 14 assists in 57 matches.

While at college, Craig played one season for the National Premier Soccer League side Rocket City United and two seasons for the Ocala Stampede of the Premier Development League.  Over the course of his two seasons with Ocala, Craig appeared in 26 matches, scoring three goals with one assist. In both of his years with the Stampede, the team won the PDL's Southeastern Conference and made the national semi-final with Craig being named to the All Conference team in 2015.

Club career

Louisville City FC

2016 season
Craig signed his first professional contract with United Soccer League club Louisville City FC on March 14, 2016.  He made his professional debut on April 16 against FC Cincinnati. He appeared in 15 of Louisville's 28 regular season matches scoring one goal with one assist. He played in one of Louisville's two US Open Cup matches as well all three of Louisville's USL Cup matches.  In the Eastern Conference finals match against the New York Red Bulls II Craig scored Louisville's lone goal and was sent off in extra time. Louisville lost the match on penalties.

2017 season
Craig missed the first game of the 2017 season while serving a suspension for being sent off in the Eastern Conference Finals match from the previous season. He made his season debut on March 30 against Orlando City B and went onto play in 21 of Louisville's 32 regular season matches.  He scored two goals which occurred in consecutive games on July 22 and 29th against Saint Louis FC and New York Red Bulls II respectively as well as register two assists. In addition he'd appear in one of Louisville's US Open Cup matches and all four of their USL Cup matches. At the end of the season he was named to the USL All League First Team. He was second in USL Defender of the year voting. Louisville went on to win the USL Cup Final against Swope Park.

2018 season
Craig had his contract renewed with Louisville City FC. He made his season debut on March 17 against USL expansion side Nashville SC.  Craig appeared in 32 of Louisville's 34 league matches, missing one match due to a suspension. Craig scored 2 goals. He also appeared in all five of Louisville's U.S. Open Cup matches scoring one goal as Louisville reached the quarter finals of the competition for the first time in its history. This included a 3–2 victory over the New England Revolution of MLS; Louisville's first victory over an MLS side.

Craig appeared in all four of Louisville's USL Cup playoff matches going goalless. Craig and Louisville went on to win the USL Cup Final for the second consecutive season. This time against Phoenix.  After the season he was again named to the USL All League First Team and finished second in USL Defender of the year voting behind Forrest Lasso.

Wycombe Wanderers
On 25 February 2020, Craig signed a one-month contract with Wycombe Wanderers. He played his first game against Hungerford Town on the same evening in the Berks & Bucks Senior Cup. However, he never made a league appearance for Wycombe due to his contract expiring during the COVID-19 situation.

Miami FC
On 13 January 2021, Craig signed with Miami FC of the USL Championship.

Honours

Club
Louisville City FC
USL Cup (2): 2017, 2018

Individual
USL All League First Team (3): 2017, 2018, 2021
USL All League Second Team (2): 2019, 2022

References

External links
 
 

Living people
1992 births
English footballers
Footballers from Greater London
English expatriate footballers
Black British sportspeople
Association football defenders
Bishop's Stortford F.C. players
Ocala Stampede players
Louisville City FC players
Wycombe Wanderers F.C. players
Miami FC players
National Premier Soccer League players
USL League Two players
Expatriate soccer players in the United States
USL Championship players
English expatriate sportspeople in the United States
English people of Jamaican descent
English people of Italian descent